Prosper Afam Amah (born 15 September 1973) is an Anglican bishop in Nigeria: he is the current Bishop of Ogbara, one of nine within the Anglican Province of the Niger, itself one of 14 provinces within the Church of Nigeria.

Amah was born on 15 September 1973 in Uruagu. He is a graduate of Paul University and the University of Nigeria. He reached the post of Archdeacon before consecration, becoming Bishop of Ogbara in 2018.

Notes

Paul University alumni
People from Nnewi
1973 births
Living people
Anglican bishops of Ogbaru
21st-century Anglican bishops in Nigeria
Church of Nigeria archdeacons
University of Nigeria alumni